Nîmes-Pont-du-Gard station (French: Gare de Nîmes-Pont-du-Gard) is a French TGV and TER train station in the communes of Manduel and Redessan, near Nîmes, in Southern France. It was opened on 15 December 2019 on the Contournement Nîmes – Montpellier high-speed railway line and Tarascon–Sète-Ville line.

History 
The name of the new station caused some confusion as it located some 12 km (7.4 mi) from Nîmes itself and 20 km (12.4 mi) from the Pont du Gard. After the project started in 2017, the station was opened on 15 December 2019 although no train operated during the first five days, due to a strike.  

It was designed by AREP.

Gallery

References 

Railway stations in Gard